Cephalopholis spiloparaea, known commonly as the strawberry hind strawberry rock cod, strawberry cod or orange rock cod, is a species of marine ray-finned fish, a grouper from the subfamily Epinephelinae which is in the family Serranidae which also includes the anthias and sea basses. This fish occurs throughout the Indo-Pacific region.

Description
Cephalopholis spiloparaea has a body which has a standard length is 2.6 to 3 times the depth. The dorsal fin has 9 spines and 14-16 soft rays while the anal fin has 3 spines and 9-10 soft rays. The pectoral fins are markedly longer than the pelvic fins and it has a rounded caudal fin. There are 47-53 scales in the lateral line. The background colour is pale reddish orange and it is marked with dark red or brownish red mottling and blotches. There are normally faint pale spots on the head, body, and dorsal, anal and caudal fins. The caudal fin is normally the same colour as the body, although some specimens from the Comoros Islands show distinctly yellowish tails, with a bluish white submarginal band at the corners of the tail, thinning and moving to the margin at the tail's centre. The margin of the soft-rayed part of the anal fin and, to s lesser extent the dorsal fin, is bluish. Sometimes here are 8 faint dark saddle blotches along the base of the dorsal fin with a ninth on the anterior of the caudal peduncle. This species attains a maximum total length of >

Distribution
Cephalopholis spiloparaea has a wide Indo-Pacific distribution from the East African coats where it extends from Kenya south to Pinda in Mozambique, east across the Indian Ocean into the pacific as far east as French Polynesia and Pitcairn Island. They occur as far north as the Ryukyu Islands and south to the Rowley Shoals in Western Australia and Heron Island in the southern part of Queensland's Great Barrier Reef.

Habitat and biology
Cephalopholis spiloparaea is largely found in islands, apart from the population at Pinda in Mozambique. It is the commonest species of grouper on these types of reef in the Indo-Pacific. It has been shown to live in harems dominated by a male. They feed on crabs and other crustaceans and normally forage at night or in the very early morning, just before or just after dawn.

Utilisation
Cephalopholis spiloparaea is of minor commercial importance to fisheries but the depth at which it is found appears to offer some protection from overexploitation.

References

External links
 

spiloparaea
Fish described in 1828